Kfar Gidon (lit. Gideon Village) is a moshav in northern Israel. Located near Afula, it falls under the jurisdiction of Jezreel Valley Regional Council.

History

The moshav was founded in 1923 by immigrants from Transylvania who were members of Hapoel HaMizrachi, and was named after the Biblical figure of Gideon (Judges 7:1). At first the settlement was supposed to be called Moshav Transylvania and it was planned by architect Richard Kauffmann.

In 1956 it split in two co-operative societies; Kfar Gidon (Haredi) and Talmei Gidon (traditional/secular). However, as a result of reforms in the regional council, the village returned to having one administration.

Notable residents
Israel Amidan (1921–1968), musician and composer

References

Moshavim
Populated places established in 1923
Populated places in Northern District (Israel)
Romanian-Jewish culture in Israel
1923 establishments in Mandatory Palestine